Radio Shariat (meaning Islamic law) was the mouthpiece of the Taliban-ruled Islamic Emirate of Afghanistan, broadcasting religious programs and official decrees and announcements. The broadcasts were carried over twenty transmitting towers. It was the foreign media's main source of information from the Taliban.

Early in the United States invasion of Afghanistan, on October 8, 2001, U.S. forces bombed the main building and antennas of Radio Shariat. The U.S. then utilized the same frequencies to broadcast music with instrumental accompaniments (which had been banned by the Taliban) as well as announcements and information in Dari and Pashto.

The U.S. bombing of the station was decried by members of the international media.

External links 
 An AP Article that refers to Radio Shariat

Radio stations in Afghanistan
Taliban
Defunct mass media in Afghanistan